The Brower Youth Awards are annual awards presented to environmental and social justice leaders under the age of 23.  The awards are in honor of David Brower and his work mentoring emerging environmental leaders.  In addition to a $3,000 cash award and an all expenses paid trip to the San Francisco Bay Area to attend the awards ceremony, winners receive ongoing support and mentoring from Earth Island Institute staff and other environmental leaders.

North American activist leaders ages 13 to 22 are eligible to apply.  Projects must have a measurable environmental and social impact and have demonstrated significant progress by the application deadline.

The awards ceremony has been held each fall in the San Francisco Bay Area, most recently at the Herbst Theatre in San Francisco; during the Covid-19 pandemic, the ceremony has been held virtually.

Criteria

Outstanding youth leadership and project impact

"Outstanding leadership" means that the recipient played a major leadership role in creating, organizing, and implementing their project or campaign. The juries are looking for the person with the vision, motivation, and leadership skills that made the project or campaign work.

Impact is gauged by the extent to which efforts benefited the environment and community in terms of measurable results (e.g. acres of wildlife habitat protected or restored, number of people engaged in social issues because of the project, numbers of children no longer exposed to toxins, etc.), as well as movement-building and raising awareness.

Conservation
CONSERVATION is work to eliminate or decrease use of natural resources and negative impacts on ecosystems and communities. For example:

A campaign that plays a substantial role in organizing a local community to pass a public transportation initiative.

A project that significantly reduces energy use on a school campus by requiring passive solar design and the use of efficient appliances in all school facilities.

"Conserve the golden eggs carefully. Preserve the goose or there will be no more golden eggs. If you've already damaged the goose, get going on restoration." -- David R. Brower

Preservation
PRESERVATION is work to protect ecosystems, species, indigenous cultures, and other irreplaceable elements of the world's natural heritage. For example:

A project that secures a protected nesting area for an endangered songbird.

A campaign that plays a substantial role in blocking development of Native sacred sites via ongoing peaceful civil disobedience (demonstrations, street theater, marches).

Restoration
RESTORATION is work to re-establish the healthy functioning of ecosystems, parts of ecosystems, and human communities that manage ecosystems. For example:

A project that reclaims an abandoned urban lot, creates an organic garden.

A campaign that works to eliminate carbon emissions and mitigates the impacts of global warming.

Selection process
The Brower Youth Award recipients are selected by an independent panel of judges, including activists, educators, journalists, and environmental advocates.  The Selection Committee changes for each cycle of the Brower Youth Awards.  Each jury is made up of experts from a range of disciplines.  Supported by a committee of Brower Youth Awards alumni and the Earth Island Institute staff, the Selection Committee ensures that award recipients are engaged in bold, visionary, and powerful leadership and activism.

Since 2000, more than 50 experts have served on the Brower Youth Awards Selection Committee.

The 2009 Selection Committee consisted of Bill McKibben, author-educator-environmentalist; Josh Dorfman, The Lazy Environmentalist; Lynn Hirshfield, Participant Media; Rha Goddess, hip hop artist; Thao Pham, Clif Bar; Barbara Brower, Professor at Portland State and daughter of David Brower; Angie Coiro, host of the Angie Coiro Show; Dave Foreman, Rewilding Institute; Phillipe Cousteau, EarthEcho Intl; and Dune Lankard, Redzone.

Past winners

2000
 Barbara Brown, 14, Victoria, TX: Launched the "Don't be Crude" program to stop people from using oil as a weed killer
 Tamica Davis, 18, Dorchester, MA: Organized an Anti-Idling March in memory of Walter Kirnon, a young boy who died from asthma
 Matt Ewing, 20, Chicago, IL: Coordinated Iowa Students Toward Environmental Protection (IowaStep), a statewide network of college environmental groups
 Dave Karpf, 21, Philadelphia, PA: Directed the Sierra Student Coalition
 Ariana Katovich, 22, Berkeley, CA: Created the Shoreline Preservation Fund, a ballot initiative for the students at University of California Santa Barbara
 Bethany Larue, 16, Groveport, OH: Set out to change Ohio's destruction of millions of acres of wetlands

2001
 Deland Chan, 16, New York City, NY: Became the prime mover of the Roots and Shoots project at the 92nd Street Y in New York City
 Angela Coryell, 19, Baring, WA: Came up with the idea for, produced, and directed an award-winning documentary film called An Oily Sky
 Jared Duval, 18, Lebanon, NH: Founded and coordinated Students for a Sustainable Future
 Robert Fish, 23, Bar Harbor, ME: Led campus activists in a non-violent direct action campaign against old-growth forest product retailers
 Heide Iravani, 18, Charlotte, NC: Founded and led a school-based chapter Free the Planet!, serving as a local organizer
 Grayson Schleppegrell, 13, Charleston, SC: Led a campaign to rescue endangered swordfish populations off the coast of the East United States

2002
 Jessian Choy, 21, Santa Cruz, CA: Founded the Student Environmental Center at the University of California, Santa Cruz
 Max Harper, 20, Hotchkiss, CO: Developed a Sustainable Living Theme House at Colorado College to engage students in environmental sustainability
 Stephanie Lacy, 17, Bandera, TX: Initiated a paper recycling program that diverted 280 tons of paper from landfill and saved 4600 trees
 Amir Nadav, 17, Eagan, MN: Initiated and led a campaign to reduce Minnesota students' exposure to dangerous diesel exhaust
 Ethan Schaffer, 21, Sagle, ID: Created Organic Volunteers, a national outreach program for sustainability and organic food systems
 Nathan Wyeth, 17, Chevy Chase, MD: Co-founded the Sierra Student Coalition's Student Action on the Global Economy (SAGE) Program

2003
 Rachel Ackoff, 18, Claremont, CA: Organized trainings to give activists tools to work for a global trade system that protected the rights of the environment and working people
 Andrew Azman, 21, Owings Mill, MD: Founded CU Biodiesel, to switch University of Colorado buses and City of Boulder buses from petroleum diesel fuel to vegetable oil biodiesel fuel
 Whitney Cushing, 16, Homer, AK: Founded Homer Alaskan Youth for Environmental Action (HAYEA) who successfully stopped oil and gas development near native villages
 Andrew Hunt, 22, Bethesda, MD: Established a Maryland-wide network of college and high school student environmental activists to affect public policy
 Illai Kenney, 14, Jonesboro, GA: Cofounded Georgia Kids Against Pollution in response to the growing numbers of local children with asthma in the Atlanta metro area
 Thomas Nichols, 14, Corrales, NM: Conceived and implemented a program to preserve the fragile Rio Grande ecosystems

2004
 Lily Dong, 16, South Pasadena, CA: Protected and restored the last remaining undeveloped area in Los Angeles, the Arroyo Seco
 Hannah McHardy, 17, Seattle, WA: Founded The Old Growth Project to persuade her high school to switch from using virgin fiber paper to 100 percent post-consumer-waste paper
 Billy Parish, 22, New Haven, CT: Rallied students at hundreds of colleges around the Northeast to take on global warming with The Climate Campaign
 Eugene Pearson, 21, Boulder, CO: Convinced administration to make CU-Boulder's building standards the greenest in the country
 Christina Wong, 21, Sacramento, CA: Founded a local chapter of the League of Conservation Voters, a non-partisan watchdog organization at UC-Berkeley
 Shadia Wood, 17, New York, NY: Spent years lobbying to pass legislation on New York's Superfund, even constructing a lemonade stand in front of the Capitol to raise money

2005
 Kayla Carpenter, 17,  and Erika Chase, 17, Hoopa, CA: Organizing the Salmon Run Relay to educate the community about the Klamath and Trinity Rivers, their fish populations, and native diet and cultures
 Andrea Garza, 21, Albuquerque, NM: Founding Esperanza Unida, a group focused on social and environmental justice in her hometown Brownsville, Texas
 Jessica Rimington, 19, Cotuit, MA: Launching the One World Youth Project to promote cultural exchange, youth leadership and community service around the world
 Daniel Rosen, 19, Flagstaff, AZ: Organizing "All Peoples Power Summit: Building Communities of Hope, Strength and Sustainability," which brought 200 youth from around the globe
 La Constance Shahid, 18, San Francisco, CA: Restoring the Yosemite Wetlands in Bayview-Hunters Point and working to combat the destructive effects of industrialization and landfills
 Zander Srodes, 15, Placidia, FL: Publishing the Turtle Talks Activity book, curricula, and other materials to promote conservation of loggerhead turtles

2006
 Jessica Assaf, 16, San Rafael, CA: Creating "Operation Beauty Drop" during which large bins were placed in public malls for teenagers to drop off their toxic beauty products
 May Boeve, 21, Middlebury, VT:  Traveling on The Road to Detroit, a  road trip around the country to collect over 11,000 pledges to buy union-made, clean cars when they are made available
  Karoline Evin McMullen, 16, Chesterland, OH: founding Save Our Stream, which advocated for the restoration of the Chagrin River
 Alberta Nells, 16, Flagstaff, AZ: Mobilizing youth to successfully halt the development of an Arizona ski resort on peaks held sacred by over 13 Native American Nations
 Elissa Smith, 21, Ottawa, ON: Influencing U.S. policy and participating in bilateral climate negotiations with China, Brazil, India, and Kenya as a Canadian government delegate
 Ruben Vogt, 22, El Paso, TX: Founding CYnergy Fellowship, dedicated to empowering students to tackle prevalent issues by devising effective community-based solutions

2007
 Rachel Barge, 21, Berkeley, CA: Creating The Green Initiative Fund, a student fee referendum passed by the students at the University of California - Berkeley
 Erica Fernandez, 16, Oxnard, CA: Mobilizing the youth and Latino voices in her community against a liquified natural gas facility off the coast of Oxnard
 Q'Orianka Kilcher, 17, Santa Monica, CA: Directing publicity and media attention from a recent film towards the plight faced by the Achuar community of Peru
 Alexander Lin, 14, Westerly, RI: Collecting 21,000 pounds of E-waste and helping to draft and pass a statewide bill banning the dumping of E-waste
 Carlos Moreno, 19, Boston, MA: Addressing the increase of violence in Boston and creating more opportunities for summer youth employment with his Summer Jobs Campaign
 Jon Warnow, 23, Burlington, VT: Developing an internet strategy for Step It Up 2007, a coordinated national day of climate action

2008
 Marisol Becerra, 18, Chicago, IL:  Mapping and inventory of industrial toxins
 Jessie-Ruth Corkins, 17, Bristol, VT: Leadership of the Vermont Sustainable Heating Initiative
 Timothy DenHerder-Thomas, 21, St. Paul, MN: Spearheading the creation of the Clean Energy Revolving Fund (CERF) at Macalester College
 Kari Fulton, 22, Washington, DC:  Co-founding the Loving Our City, Loving Ourselves (LOCLOS) campus and community initiative, as well as training young leaders of color through the Environmental Justice and Climate Change Initiative
 Phebe Meyers, 18, Woodstock, VT: Co-founding Change the World Kids, which focuses on permanently creating a migratory corridor in the Costa Rican rainforest, restoring it with native trees, and inspiring others to protect the global environment
 Ivan Stiefel, 22, Mullica Hill, NJ: Co-creating an alternative spring break for university students to stand in solidarity with communities affected by coal industry abuses

2009
 Sierra Crane-Murdoch, 21, Middlebury, VT: Co-founded Power Past Coal to spotlight communities impacted by the mining, processing, and burning of coal
 Alec Loorz, 15, Ventura, CA: Speaks to thousands about the impact of climate change on the next generation
 Diana Lopez, 20, San Antonio, TX: Co-created an organic garden at a site in San Antonio, Texas as part of the struggle for environmental justice
 Adarsha Shivakumar, 16, Pleasant Hill, CA: Created Project Jatropha for a biofuel solution in rural India
 Hai Vo, 22, Irvine, CA: Transformed the food purchasing and eating practices at universities across California

2010
 Freya Chay, 15, Kenai, AK: Energizing the Alaskan legislature
 Marcus Grignon, 21, Keshena, WI: Encouraging Sustainability on the Menominee Reservation
 De’Anthony Jones, 18, San Francisco, CA: Fostering Service Learning
 Ana Elisa Peréz-Quintero, 20, San Juan, PR: Promoting Environmental Education
 Varsha Vijay, 22, Coralville, IA: Empowering Amazon Tribes with Information
 Misra Walker, 18, Bronx, NY: Getting People to the Park

2011
 Victor Davila, 17, Bronx, NY: Making environmental education fun and engaging for young folks
 Alexander Epstein, 20, Philadelphia, PA: Mobilizing New York City high school students around the parallel struggles of New Orleans and their own communities
 Rhiannon Tomtishen & Madison Vorva, 15 and 16, Ann Arbor, MI: Petitioning palm oil plantations (for Girl Scout cookies!) which are one of the leading causes of orangutan habitat destruction
 Tania Pulido, 21, Richmond, CA: Running a community garden for youth in a city of high crime and industrial pollution
 Kyle Thiermann, 21, Santa Cruz, CA: Shifting local economy away from coal-funding banks using video marketing tactics
 Junior Walk, 21, Whitesville, WV: educating people about the long-term environmental, health and community degradation caused by coal mining

2012
 Martin Figueroa, 21, Los Angeles, CA: Reducing water use and improve energy efficiency on his college campus
 Jacob Glass, 21, Glastonbury, CT: Created a film to document grassroots efforts to save an 88,000-acre wilderness area
 Ryland King, 22, Goleta, CA: Started a program that recruits college students to teach elementary school kids about their environment
 Asa Needle, 16, Worcester, MA: Leading a youth-run cooperative that offers residents soil testing, remediation, and lead-free landscaping services
 Maya Salsedo, 19, Santa Cruz, CA: Creating a Youth Food Bill of Rights intended to give local communities more control over the food they eat
 Brittany Stallworth, 21, Washington, DC: Founded "Green is the New Black" — a food and environmental justice campaign at Howard University

2013 

 Amia Odeh, San Juan, PR: Fostering sustainable water consumption at the University of Puerto Rico’s Rio Piedras campus
 Chloe Maxmin, Nobleboro, ME: Challenging one of the oldest higher education institutions in the U.S. to divest from fossil fuels
 Cassandra Lin, Westerly, RI: Connecting the dots between community needs and biofuel waste for an unconventional solution
 Alex Freid, Durham, NH: Launching resourceful student led programs on college campuses to reduce waste and encourage reuse
 Jonathan Ferrer, Brooklyn, NY: Generating climate awareness and resiliency amongst New York City's youth
 Arielle Klagsbrun, St. Louis, MO: Mobilizing communities to create a healthy future free of dependence on big coal

2014 

 Sean Russel, North Port, FL: Launching an educational campaign about marine debris
 Doorae Shin, Honolulu, HI: Working towards a ban on Styrofoam use in Hawai‘i
 Tsechu Dolma, Woodside NY: Creating a model for sustainable food security in Upper Mustang, Nepal
 Jackson Koeppel, Highland Park: MI: Building community resilience through solar powered infrastructure
 Lynnea Shuck, Fremont, CA: Propelling childhood curiosity into lasting environmental stewardship
 Tiffany Carey, Detroit, MI: Engaging youth in solutions-based, citizen-science projects

2015 

 Celeste Tinajero, Sparks, NV: Making impactful and lasting changes through greening a high school campus
 Ryan Camero, Stockton, CA: Using creative storytelling to chronicle a fragile delta and the communities that surround it
 Kate Weiner, White Plains, NY: Creating an alternative space for environmental media through a student-run arts collective
 Dyanna Jaye, Charlottesville, VA: Mobilizing a civically engaged environmental youth coalition
 Jess Grady-Benson, Claremont, CA: Fostering fossil fuel divestment campaigns on college campuses through student training
 JP Viñals, Bronx, NY: Energizing a campaign for urban green spaces through youth engagement

2016 

 Heidi Kritz, Dillingham, AK: Fueling a decade-long fight to protect Bristol Bay
 Erica Davis, Knoxville, TN: Advocating for frontline communities in Tennessee
 Susette Onate, Hialeah, FL: Fostering stewardship through a native butterfly garden
 Karina Gonzalez, Flagstaff, AZ: Leading inclusive divestment efforts in Arizona
 Xerxes Libsch, White Plains, NY: Restoring and creating an educational wild space
 Will Amos, Irvine, CA: Engineering possibility for impactful change

2017 

 Anthony Torres, Babylon, NY: Inspiring communities to demand climate action
 Charlie Jiang, Washington D.C.: Pushing Wall Street to make just investments
 Dejah Powell, Chicago, IL: Fostering a love for the environment
 Anne Lee, Sammamish, WA: Challenging schools to adopt low carbon solutions
 Dineen O'Rourke, East Quogue, NY: Encouraging non-violent, direct action
 Mercedes Thompson and Claire Wayner, Baltimore, MD: Working towards a plastic-free Maryland

2018 

 Stephen O'Hanlon, Downingtown, PA: Communicating the need for political action
 Tina Oh, Sackville, New Brunswick: Amplifying narratives of frontline communities
 Valeree Catangay, Long Beach, CA: Advocating for a more inclusive environmental movement
 Rose Whipple, St. Paul, MN: Speaking up against oil pipelines on Indigenous lands
 Mishka Banuri, Salt Lake CIty, UT: Intersectional organizing for climate justice
 Jade Sweeney, Jacksonville, NC: Supporting our key pollinators

2019 

 Isha Clarke, Oakland, CA: Fighting the development of a coal plant in West Oakland
 Mackenzie Feldman, Honolulu, HI: Working to ban pesticides in schools
 Lia Harel, Minnetonka, MN: Organizing a youth environmental movement in Minnesota
 Isra Hirsi, Minneapolis, MN: Leading a nationwide climate strike
 Shannon Lisa, Avenel, NJ: Investigating chemicals that lead to cancer
 Tammy Ramos, Los Angeles, CA: Challenging oil refinery pollution in a low income community

See also
 List of environmental awards

References

External links
 http://www.broweryouthawards.org/
 Application information

American awards
Environmental awards